Mayflower: The Pilgrims' Adventure is a 1979 American made-for-television historical adventure film dramatizing the Pilgrims' voyage from Plymouth, England to Cape Cod in New England aboard the Mayflower in 1620. The film was directed by George Schaefer and stars Anthony Hopkins, Richard Crenna, and Jenny Agutter.

The story focuses on romantic interactions between the passengers and crew, with People describing it as "plotted like a pre-shuffleboard Love Boat".

The film was first broadcast by CBS on November 21, 1979.

Cast
Anthony Hopkins as Captain Christopher Jones
Richard Crenna as the Pilgrim leader William Brewster
Jenny Agutter as Priscilla Mullens
Michael Beck as John Alden
David Dukes as Myles Standish
Trish Van Devere as Rose Standish

References

External links

1979 films
1970s adventure films
Films set in 1620
Films set in Massachusetts
Films set in the Thirteen Colonies
Seafaring films based on actual events
Sea adventure films
CBS network films
Films directed by George Schaefer
Films scored by Brad Fiedel
Mayflower
1970s English-language films